Coetzenburg Stadium is a multi-sports venue in Stellenbosch, South Africa, on a portion of the old Coetsenburg Estate which was founded by Dirk Coetsee in 1682 after a grant of land from the Dutch Governor of the Cape Colony Simon van der Stel. The stadium is owned by the Stellenbosch University.

The stadium is used by both Stellenbosch F.C. and Stellenbosch University.

It is adjacent to the Danie Craven Stadium.

See also

Coetsenburg
Dirk Coetsee
Stellenbosch Mountain
Assegaaibosch

References

External links

Official website

Stellenbosch
Soccer venues in South Africa
Multi-purpose stadiums in South Africa
Sports venues in the Western Cape
Stellenbosch F.C.
Athletics (track and field) venues in South Africa